is a Japanese television drama series and the 96th asadora series, following Beppinsan. It was premiered on April 3, 2017, and ended on September 30, 2017.

Plot
Mineko Yatabe is a teenager living in a very rural area of Ibaraki Prefecture in 1964, the year of the Tokyo Olympics. Her father, Minoru, is a farmer, and often goes to Tokyo to do extra work for the family. This time, however, he goes missing. Mineko travels to Tokyo to find him, and begins to work at a small electronics factory while continuing her search. She makes many friends there, but the factory goes bankrupt and she is left unemployed. Luckily, she is hired by Suzuko Makino as a waitress at her restaurant, the Suzufuri-tei, which happened to be her father's favorite eatery. She lives at the boarding house next door, in which live a variety of people, from manga artists to college students. Mineko falls in love with a college student, Junichirō Shimatani, but they part when his father forces him to marry to save the family business. Mineko becomes friends with the movie star, Setsuko Kawamoto, who after learning of Mineko's father, reveals that Minoru has been living in her apartment all along. He lost his memory in a fight and Setsuko took him in. Mineko returns Minoru to his family in Ibaraki. Mineko then falls in love with Hidetoshi Maeda, one of the junior chefs at the Suzufuri-tei. She also helps Setsuko, when Setsuko needs to flee from the press after her aunt and uncle misappropriated her money.

Cast

Main character
Kasumi Arimura as Mineko Yatabe

Oku-Ibaraki village

Yatabe family
 as Shigeru Yatabe, Mineko's grandfather
Ikki Sawamura as Minoru Yatabe, Mineko's father
Yoshino Kimura as Miyoko Yatabe, Mineko's mother
 as Chiyoko Yatabe, Mineko's sister
 as Susumu Yatabe, Mineko's brother
Kazunobu Mineta as Muneo Koiwai, Mineko's uncle
 as Shigeko Koiwai, Muneo's wife and Mineko's aunt

Sukegawa family
Yui Sakuma as Tokiko Sukegawa, Mineko's childhood friend and classmate
Michiko Hada as Kimiko Sukegawa, Tokiko's mother
 as Shōji Sukegawa, Tokiko's father
 as Toyosaku Sukegawa, Tokiko's brother

Sumitani family
 as Mitsuo Sumitani, Mineko's childhood friend and classmate
Rie Shibata as Kiyo Sumitani, Mitsuo's mother
 as Masao Sumitani, Mitsuo's father
Hiroyuki Onoue as Tarō Sumitani, Mitsuo's brother

Others
Satoru Matsuo as Jirō Mashiko, a school bus conductor
Kanji Tsuda as Manabu Tagami, a high school teacher

Tokyo people

Suzufuri-tei
Nobuko Miyamoto as Suzuko Makino, the shop owner
Kuranosuke Sasaki as Shōgo Makino, the chef
Hitomi Satō as Takako Asakura, the hall clerk
 as Kenji Igawa
Hayato Isomura as Hidetoshi Maeda

Mukoujima Radio Factory
Emi Wakui as Aiko Nagai
Fujiko Kojima as Sachiko Akiba
 as Yūko Natsui
 as Sumiko Nabatame
 as Toyoko Kanehira

Others
Ryo Ryusei as Masayoshi Watahiki
Kayoko Shiraishi as Tomi Tachibana
Ryoma Takeuchi as Junichirō Shimatani
Kavka Shishido as Sanae Kusaka
 as Yūji Tsubouchi
Amane Okayama as Keisuke Nitta
 as Ichirō Kashiwagi
Ken Mitsuishi as Gorō Fukuda
Tomoko Ikuta as Yasue Fukuda
Miho Shiraishi as Kuniko Takeuchi
 as Yasuharu Kashiwagi
 as Zenzou Abe
Sairi Ito as Saori Abe
Haruka Shimazaki as Yuka Makino
Miho Kanno as Setsuko Kawamoto
Kai Inowaki as Yudai Takashima

Hiyokko 2

Reception
The series was a ratings success, averaging 20.4% over the length of the series, with ratings improving as the show progressed.

References

External links
 

Asadora
2017 Japanese television series debuts
2017 Japanese television series endings
Television series about teenagers
Television series set in 1964
Television shows set in Ibaraki Prefecture
Television shows set in Tokyo